Pelzeln's tody-tyrant (Hemitriccus inornatus) is a species of bird in the family Tyrannidae. It is endemic to Brazil. Its natural habitat is subtropical or tropical dry shrubland.

References

Pelzeln's tody-tyrant
Birds of the Brazilian Amazon
Endemic birds of Brazil
Pelzeln's tody-tyrant
Taxonomy articles created by Polbot